A Brodie abscess is a subacute osteomyelitis, which may persist for years before progressing to a chronic, frank osteomyelitis. Classically, this may present after progression to a draining abscess extending from the tibia out through the skin. Occasionally acute osteomyelitis may be contained to a localized area and walled off by fibrous and granulation tissue.

The most frequent causative organism is Staphylococcus aureus.

Presentation
Localized pain, often nocturnal, alleviated by aspirin. Often mimics the symptoms of osteoid osteoma, which is typically less than 1 cm in diameter.

Location
Usually occurs at the metaphysis of long bones.
Distal tibia,
proximal tibia,
distal femur,
proximal or distal fibula, and
distal radius.

Diagnosis

Radiographic features
Oval, elliptical, or serpentine radiolucency usually greater than 1 cm surrounded by a heavily reactive sclerosis, granulation tissue, and a nidus often less than 1 cm.  The margins often appear scalloped on radiograph.  Brodie's abscess is best visualized using computed tomography (CT) scan.
Associated atrophy of soft tissue near the site of infection and shortening of the affected bone. Osteoblastoma may be a classic sign for Brodie's abscess.

Treatment
In the majority of cases, surgery has to be performed.
If the cavity is small then surgical evacuation and curettage is performed under antibiotic cover.
If the cavity is large then the abscess space may need packing with cancellous bone chips after evacuation.

History
Brodie abscess is named after Sir Benjamin Collins Brodie, 1st Baronet. In the 1830s, he initially described a chronic inflammatory condition affecting the tibia without obvious acute etiology. It was later discovered that this was caused by infection.

References

External links 

Bacterial diseases
Osteopathies